"Let It All Go" is a song by British musician, singer and songwriter Rhodes and English musician Birdy. It was released as a digital download on 11 September 2015 in the United Kingdom, as the second single from Rhodes' debut studio album, Wishes (2015). The song was written and produced by Rhodes and Birdy.

Music video 
The music video for the song was published on the official Birdy YouTube channel on 11 August 2015. It was filmed in Edinburgh, and features Birdy and Rhodes singing in a purple valley. It has currently amounted over 86 million views.

Track listing

Weekly charts

Certifications

Release history

References

2015 singles
Birdy (singer) songs
2015 songs
Folk ballads
Warner Music Group singles
2010s ballads